Zhao Zhiyong (born April 1955) is a former Chinese politician, banker, and regional official. He served as the Vice Governor of Jiangxi province between March 2002 to June 2008, and Communist Party Secretary of Jiujiang, from June 2005 to November 2006. He also served as Secretary-General of Jiangxi Provincial Party Committee from 2008 until June 2014, when he was dismissed for corruption.

Zhao was said to have "seriously violated party discipline," expelled from the Communist Party in July 2014, and demoted from a sub-provincial-level position directly to the lowest administrative level of the civil service of keyuan. Zhao's demotion was notable for its severity.

Career
Zhao was born and raised in Yi County, Hebei, he earned his Ph.D. degree from Southwestern University of Finance and Economics.

He got involved in politics in February 1970 and joined the Chinese Communist Party in October 1973.

Beginning in 1992, he served in several posts in the Jiangxi provincial branch of the Industrial and Commercial Bank of China (ICBC), China's largest bank, including director and managing director.

In August 2000, he was transferred to Nanchang, Jiangxi. In March 2002, he was appointed as Vice Governor of Jiangxi province, and re-elected in December 2006. He also served as the CPC Party Chief of Jiujiang between June 2005 to November 2006. In June 2008, he became the Secretariat-General of Jiangxi Provincial Party Committee, he was re-elected on June 1, 2014.

On June 3, 2014, Zhao was dismissed from his posts for "serious violations of laws and regulations". On July 16, 2014, Zhao was expelled from the Chinese Communist Party, and demoted seven administrative levels from sub-provincial level down to keyuan, roughly equivalent in ranking to an intern or an entry-level position, the very lowest administrative level in the civil service.

References

1955 births
Living people
People's Republic of China politicians from Hebei
Politicians from Baoding
Political office-holders in Hebei
Southwestern University of Finance and Economics alumni
Chinese Communist Party politicians from Hebei
Expelled members of the Chinese Communist Party
Industrial and Commercial Bank of China people
Chinese bankers
Businesspeople from Baoding